Durley is a village and civil parish in the City of Winchester district of Hampshire, England. It is located approximately 7½ miles northeast of Southampton and has a population of around 992. The village is home to two pubs, The Robin Hood Inn and the Farmers Home. Both of the pubs have a rich history dating back till the nineteenth century. Durley is home to one school, Durley CE Primary. Which is home to approximately 130 pupils ranging from four to eleven years of age. The village also has one pre-school called Durley Ladybirds. The village is also home to a local church called the Church of the Holy Cross where services are regularly held.

Governance
The village is part of the civil parish of Durley and is part of the Owslebury and Curdridge ward of the City of Winchester non-metropolitan district of Hampshire County Council. There are currently seven parishioners in the Parish where elections take place if there is enough people running office. The last election was 2 May 2019.

Church

The village Church is the Holy Cross. It has some external features that date from the 13th century while its font appears to be 12th century. The church underwent a significant restoration in 1879.

References

Villages in Hampshire
Civil parishes in Winchester